Wöllmarshausen is a village in the Garte valley in the municipality (Gemeinde) Gleichen in the district Göttingen, Germany.  The nucleated village of 401 residents (as of December 31, 2005) is primarily agricultural. There are a number of natural springs in and around the wooded village.

Government

Mayor: Joachim Klabunde

References

External links
http://www.gleichen.de/woellmarshausen/home.htm
map: http://www.goettingen.city-map.de/city/db/010908000000/8124/Gleichen_-_W%F6llmarshausen.html

Villages in Lower Saxony